"Joy" (stylized as "joy.") is the lead single by Christian alternative rock duo For King & Country for their third studio album, Burn the Ships (2018). It was released as a single on 18 May 2018. The song became the group's highest charting single, peaking at No. 2 on the Hot Christian Songs chart. It lasted 36 weeks on the overall chart, being in the top ten for its entire run. It also peaked at No. 14 on the Billboard Bubbling Under Hot 100, and is their second highest charting entry in their career. The song is played in a C minor key, and 120 beats per minute.

It was nominated for the 2019 Grammy Award for Best Contemporary Christian Music Performance/Song. It was also nominated for Top Christian Song at the 2019 Billboard Music Awards.

Background
"Joy" was released on 18 May 2018 as the lead single for their upcoming studio album, set to be released in autumn of 2018. The song is about raising positivity and taking out the negative in life. Both members of the group had their say on the song in an interview with Billboard:

"Joy" contains an interpolation of the song, "Joy in My Heart" written by George William Cooke

Critical reception
"Joy" was described by The Christian Beat as "bursting, celebratory anthem" with an "upbeat hook and infectious melody". Described by Billboard as "a buoyant track backed by a 100-member choir" features a refrain from the popular song "Joy in My Heart" by George William Cooke.

Music video
The music video for the single "Joy" was released on 20 May 2018. Set in the 1960s, and a black and white clip follows the group as they lead the staff on a quest for joy. The production takes place during a television news broadcast. The visual features television personality Candace Cameron Bure. Bure and Joel Smallbone portray news presenters charged with information about a major storm threatening the country.

Charts

Weekly charts

Year-end charts

Decade-end charts

Certifications

References 

2018 singles
2018 songs
For King & Country (band) songs
Songs written by Ben Glover
Warner Music Group singles
Songs written by Tedd T
Songs written by Aqualung (musician)
Songs written by Seth Mosley